Sydney Cousins Bradley (8 March 1880 – 25 November 1948) was an Australian rules footballer who played with St Kilda in the Victorian Football League (VFL).

Notes

External links 

1880 births
1948 deaths
Australian rules footballers from Victoria (Australia)
St Kilda Football Club players
North Melbourne Football Club (VFA) players